Mykhailo Lozynsky  (30 July 1880 in Kalush Raion – 3 November 1937 in Sandarmokh) he was Ukrainian politician, theater critic and diplomat. Secretary of Foreign Affairs of the State Secretariat of the West Ukrainian People's Republic (1919).

Education 
In 1893-1899 he studied at the seminary Stanislavsky. In 1900 received a matriculation school in Lviv. He studied law in Lviv, Vienna and Zurich. In 1914 he defended his thesis on the right in Vienna.

He began to publish in 1897 a Social Democratic press in Switzerland. From 1903 he worked as a lawyer and a journalist in Lviv, has worked in a number of publications - "Public voice", "Business" (Lviv), "Council" (Kyiv).

In the years 1907-1914 he lived and worked in Kyiv, Kharkiv, Odesa, Warsaw, Vilnius, Moscow, St. Petersburg). During World War I he took part in the Union for the Liberation of Ukraine.

He was member of the National Council West Ukrainian People's Republic participated in the Ukrainian delegation to the Paris Peace Conference.

From March 1919 - Deputy Secretary of State for Foreign Affairs of the Government West Ukrainian People's Republic.

Also West Ukrainian People's Republic headed the delegation at the talks with Poland.

In 1921 - 1927 - exile in Czechoslovakia professor of International Law and History of Political Thought Ukraine Ukrainian Free University (Prague).

Moved to the Ukrainian SSR in 1927, he taught at the Kharkiv Institute of National Economy and the Institute of Marxism, 1928-1930 Chair's Law, Institute of National Economy. Promoted Galicia reunification with Soviet Ukraine.

Arrested on 21 March 1930 in the case of "Ukrainian Military Organization". Judicial Board at triple GPU 23 September 1933 sentenced under Art. c. 04.06.54 Criminal Code itll 10 years. He served his sentence in Kem and Solovki, held in spetsizolyatori Savvatevo.

Special NKVD troika of the Leningrad Region 9 October 1937 sentenced to capital punishment. Shot in the Karelian ASSR (Sandarmokh) on 3 November 1937.

In 1957, rehabilitated for lack of evidence.

Author 
 Krivava knyha - Lozynsky, Mykhalo, 1880-
 The Ukrainian National Question in the Works of Mykhailo Drahomanov - Mykhailo Lozynsky
 The writings and activities of Myhkailo Drahomanov (in Ukrainian) 1915
 Halychyna v zhyttiu Ukraïny - Lozynsky, Mykhalo, 1880-
 Comment les Polonais comprennet leur liberté - Lozynsky, Mykhalo, 1880-
 Halychyna v rr. 1918-1920 - Lozynsky, Mykhalo, 1880-
 Décisions au Conseil suprême sur la Galicie orientale; les plus importants documents avec introd - Lozynsky, Mykhalo, 1880-
 Sorok lït dïial'nosty "Pros'vity" - Lozynsky, Mykhalo, 1880-

References

External links 
 
 Paris Peace Conference
 Federalism
 Galicia (Poland-Ukraine).
 Lozynsky, Mykhailo  in the Internet Encyclopedia of Ukraine, 2015
 Biographical article on Lozynsky's activities in the West Ukrainian People's Republic

1880 births
1937 deaths
People from Ivano-Frankivsk Oblast
Ukrainian Austro-Hungarians
People from the Kingdom of Galicia and Lodomeria
University of Lviv alumni
Foreign ministers of Ukraine
Ukrainian diplomats
Ukrainian editors
West Ukrainian People's Republic people
Theatrologists
Ukrainian theatre critics
Great Purge victims from Ukraine
Soviet rehabilitations
20th-century Ukrainian journalists